Glow or GLOW may refer to:

In science and technology

In computing and telecommunications
 Glow (JavaScript library), an open-source JavaScript library created by the BBC
 Glow (Scottish Schools National Intranet), a telecommunications project in Scotland

In physics
 Incandescence, the emission of electromagnetic radiation from a hot object
 Luminescence, any form of light emission not resulting from heat 
 List of light sources

Other uses in science and technology
 Glow or Bloom (shader effect), computer graphics effect
 GLOW (gross lift-off weight), see maximum takeoff weight

In arts and entertainment

In film and television 
 The Glow (film), a 2002 TV film starring Portia de Rossi
 Glow (2000 film), a film starring Frankie Ingrassia
 Glow (2011 film), a film starring Tony Lo Bianco
 The Glow (TV series), a 2000s television series starring Dean Cain
 GLOW TV, a syndicated televised version of the Gorgeous Ladies of Wrestling events from 1986 to 1990 with 104 episodes
 GLOW: The Story of the Gorgeous Ladies of Wrestling, a 2012 documentary about the 1980s TV show
 GLOW (TV series), a 2017 comedy-drama series based on the Gorgeous Ladies of Wrestling

In music

Albums 
 Glow (Al Jarreau album), 1976
 Glow (Brett Eldredge album), 2016
 Glow (Andy Hunter album), 2012
 Glow (Donavon Frankenreiter album), 2010
 Glow (The Innocence Mission album), 1995
 Glow (Jackson and His Computerband album), 2013
 Glow (Joey Yung album), or the title song, 2007
 Glow (Kaki King album), 2012
 Glow (Raven album), 1994
 Glow (Reef album), 1997
 Glow (Rick James album), 1985
 Glow (Tensnake album), 2014
 The Glow (Bonnie Raitt album), 1979
 The Glow (DMA's album), 2020
 The Glow Pt. 2, by The Microphones, 2001

Songs 
 "Glow" (Drake song), 2017
 "Glow" (Ella Henderson song), 2014
 "Glow" (Jessica Mauboy song), 2021
 "Glow" (Kelly Clarkson and Chris Stapleton song), 2021
 "Glow" (Madcon song), 2010
 "Glow" (Rick James song), 1985
 "Glow" (Spandau Ballet song), 1981
 "G.L.O.W." (song), by Smashing Pumpkins, 2008
 "Glow", by Alien Ant Farm from Truant, 2003
 "Glow", by Donna De Lory from In the Glow, 2003
 "Glow", by Gavin James, 2018
 "Glow", by Kelis from Tasty, 2003
 "Glow", by Kylie and Garibay from Sleepwalker, 2014
 "Glow", by Kym Marsh from Standing Tall, 2003
 "Glow", by Nelly Furtado from Loose, 2006
 "Glow", by Retro Stefson, 2012
 "Glow", by Salvador Sobral from Excuse Me, 2016
 "Glow", by Stray Kids from Mixtape, 2018
 "The Glow", by the Microphones from It Was Hot, We Stayed in the Water, 2000
 "The Glow Pt. 2", by the Microphones from The Glow Pt. 2, 2001

Other uses in arts and entertainment
 Glow, a 2014 book by Ned Beauman
 glow (magazine), a Canadian beauty and health magazine
 GLOW (Gorgeous Ladies of Wrestling), wrestling promotion
 GLOW (Greenville Light Opera Works), operetta company
 Glow (video game), a game developed by Empty Clip Studios for the iPhone
 GLOW Festival Eindhoven

Other uses
 GLOW (linguistics society), a linguistics society in Europe
 Glow by JLo, a perfume 
 Glow Energy, a utility company in Thailand
 Glów, a village in southern Poland

See also
 
 Glo (disambiguation)